Anastasios Rousakis (born 21 July 1985 in Greece) is a professional Greek footballer, who last played as a midfielder for Aittitos Spata.

References

External links
Apollon F.C. profile
Kallithea F.C. profile

1985 births
Living people
Football League (Greece) players
Ilioupoli F.C. players
Kallithea F.C. players
Apollon Smyrnis F.C. players
Ergotelis F.C. players
Association football midfielders
Footballers from Athens
Greek footballers